For the Summer Olympics, there are a total of 34 venues that start with the letter 'C'.

References

 List C